Mastigophorophyllidae is a family of millipedes belonging to the order Chordeumatida. Adult millipedes in this family have 30 segments (counting the collum as the first segment and the telson as the last).

Genera
This family includes the following genera:
 Bucovinosoma Tabacaru, 1978
 Haploporatia Verhoeff, 1897
 Heterobraueria Verhoeff, 1897
 Karpatophyllon Jawłowski, 1928
 Mastigona Cook, 1895
 Mastigophorophyllon Verhoeff, 1897
 Paraporatia Ceuca, 1967
 Taurinosoma Verhoeff, 1932
 Tessinosoma Verhoeff, 1911
 Thaumaporatia Verhoeff, 1900

References

Chordeumatida
Millipede families